Łukasz Sekulski (born 3 November 1990) is a Polish professional footballer who plays as a striker for Wisła Płock. Besides Poland, he has played in Russia.

Club career
He was the top goalscorer in the 2014–15 II liga campaign by scoring 30 goals for Stal Stalowa Wola. In the following season he was transferred to the Ekstraklasa club Jagiellonia Białystok, signing the three-year deal.

On 22 February 2018, he moved to the Russian Premier League side FC SKA-Khabarovsk. He left the club at the end of the year and joined ŁKS Łódź on 12 January 2019 on a 3,5-year contract the club announced.

Career statistics

External links

References

1990 births
Living people
Sportspeople from Płock
Association football forwards
Polish footballers
Ekstraklasa players
I liga players
II liga players
Russian Premier League players
Russian First League players
Wisła Płock players
Raków Częstochowa players
Stal Stalowa Wola players
Jagiellonia Białystok players
Korona Kielce players
Piast Gliwice players
FC SKA-Khabarovsk players
ŁKS Łódź players
Polish expatriate footballers
Expatriate footballers in Russia
Polish expatriate sportspeople in Russia